Saint-Just-de-Bretenières is a municipality in Quebec. It is located on the  Canada–United States border.

See also
 Daaquam River, a strea
 List of municipalities in Quebec

References

Municipalities in Quebec
Incorporated places in Chaudière-Appalaches